Ole Paus (23 March 1766 – 26 July 1855) was a Norwegian ship's captain, shipowner and land owner, who belonged to the patriciate of the port town of Skien from the late 18th century. He is noted as the stepfather of Knud Ibsen (1797–1877) as well as being the uncle of Marichen Altenburg (1799–1869) the parents of noted playwright Henrik Ibsen (1828–1906).

Biography
Ole Paus was born at Bjåland in Lårdal,  Telemark,  Norway.
In his youth, he had moved  to Skien in Vestfold og Telemark  where he was raised by relatives before went to sea as a 12-year-old and became a  skipper. 
He was married to Johanne Plesner 1770–1847) who had previously been married to ship's captain Henrich Ibsen (1765–1797). Through his marriage, 
Paus became the brother-in-law of wholesaler and shipowner  Nicolay Plesner (1774–1842). He later ran a shipping business in collaboration with Plesner. 

In other family connections,  Ole Paus was the brother-in-law of merchant, shipowner and estate owner Diderik von Cappelen (1761–1828) who was married to his wife's sister Maria Plesner  (1768–1800) in his first marriage and in his second marriage to  Marie Severine Blom (1778–1832), who was Ole Paus' cousin.
Knud Ibsen (1797–1877) had been the only child of  Johanne Plesner and Henrich Ibsen.
Ole Paus was best man at the wedding of his step-son Knud Ibsen and his niece Marichen Altenburg, a daughter of  Ole's sister Hedevig Christine Paus.

From 1801, he owned the estate Rising Nordre in Gjerpen. After  the death of his wife in 1847, he moved back to  Skien where he died during 1855.

Descendants
Ole Paus and Johanne Plesner had 5 sons and 4 daughters:

 Henrik Johan Paus (born 1799), lawyer
Christian Cornelius Paus (1800–1879), Judge, Governor of Bratsberg and Member of Parliament
Maria Marthine Paus (born 1802)
Christine Pauline Paus (born 1803), married ship's captain Gerhard van Deurs
Nicolai Kall Paus (died as an infant 1804)
Jacob von der Lippe Paus (1806–1826)
Mariane Nicoline Elisabeth Paus (born 1808)
 Christopher Blom Paus (1810–1898), Shipowner and banker
Johanne Caroline Paus (born 1813).

Ole Paus was the grandfather of factory owner Ole Paus (1846–1931) and the great-grandfather of chamberlain, land owner and art collector Christopher Tostrup Paus (1862–1943), who received a comital title from Pope Pius XI. His great-great-grandson Herman Paus married Countess Tatyana Tolstoy, a granddaughter of Leo Tolstoy, and their descendants own Herresta and other Swedish estates. Also among his descendants are General Ole Otto Paus, singer Ole Paus, fashion designer Pontine Paus and businessman Peder Nicolas Paus. Many of his descendants, including singer, songwriter Ole Paus, were named for him.

Modern references
Ole Paus was portrayed by actor Per Theodor Haugen (1932–2018) in the 2006 NRK miniseries "An Immortal Man" (En udødelig mann).

References

Norwegian businesspeople in shipping
Ole
1766 births
1855 deaths
People from Telemark